Lincoln station (also known as Haymarket station to distinguish it from the previous Lincoln station) is an Amtrak intercity train station in Lincoln, Nebraska, served daily by the California Zephyr. The station opened on June 26, 2012, replacing a station originally built in 1926 by the Chicago, Burlington and Quincy Railroad.

The previous station was abandoned because the construction of the Pinnacle Bank Arena required the re-routing of railway lines away from it.  Designed by Sinclair Hille Architects, the building is composed of brick pavilions linked by a central waiting room. A large, curved skylight in the waiting room is meant to evoke the great vaulted spaces of many historic stations. One pavilion houses the restrooms while the other holds the ticket office, baggage room, and a space for train crews. Across from the ticket office is a large photo mural depicting steam and streamlined locomotives against an antique map of Nebraska. A tall, lighted pylon with “Lincoln” spelled vertically down its front serves as a beacon for approaching travelers.

While there is no public transit directly serving the station, StarTran provides bus service nearby. The downtown transfer hub is located at the intersection of 11th Street and N Street, 8 blocks from the station, while the Route 55 trolley stops 3 blocks from the station at the intersection of 8th Street and Q Street.

References

External links

Lincoln Amtrak Station (USA RailGuide -- TrainWeb)

Amtrak stations in Nebraska
Transportation in Lincoln, Nebraska
Amtrak station
Railway stations in the United States opened in 2012
2012 establishments in Nebraska